Maria Minna  (born March 14, 1948) is a former Canadian politician who represented the Toronto riding of Beaches—East York in the House of Commons as a member of the Liberal Party from 1993 to 2011.

Background
Minna was born in Pofi, Italy, and moved to Canada with her family at the age of 9. They settled in Toronto, Ontario in the Christie Pits area. Her father worked in the construction industry and her mother laboured as a factory worker. She is the third eldest of five children, having three sisters and a brother. She attended a vocational high school earning a diploma and started working as a secretary. At age 24 she attended the University of Toronto where she graduated with an Honours B.A. in Sociology. At age 34, she married Robert MacBain, a public relations consultant.

From 1981 to 1992, she served as the volunteer president of COSTI-IIAS, Canada's largest immigrant services organization. She also served as president of the National Congress of Italian-Canadians.

Due in part to her high profile, Minna was appointed to serve on two task forces with the Worker's Compensation Board. In 1986 she co-chaired the Task Force on Vocational Rehabilitation and in 1991 she chaired a Task Force on Service Delivery. Both led to significant improvements in the operation of the WCB.

Politics
Minna sought the Liberal nomination for the riding of York West in 1984. She lost to Sergio Marchi. She also tried to get nominated in the riding of York North in 1988 but lost to Maurizio Bevilacqua. The York North nomination fight turned ugly amidst claims of delegate stacking and improper procedures. Minna later appealed the nomination but withdrew the complaint claiming that the appeal process was tainted.

In government
She was elected to parliament in the 1993 election in which the Liberal party won all but one of the 99 Ontario seats. Although the former Liberal candidate ran against her as an independent, she defeated New Democratic Party (NDP) incumbent Neil Young by a margin of two-to-one, thus becoming the first Liberal in history to represent the Beaches area south of the Danforth. As of 2008 she has been re-elected five times easily defeating high-profile candidates such as Peter Tabuns (2004 election, by 7,738 votes) and Marilyn Churley (2006 election, by 2,778 votes; 2008 election, by 4035 votes).

On August 3, 1999, Minna was appointed to Cabinet as the Minister of International Cooperation. She held the post until the beginning of 2002. On December 11, 2001, Minna was accused of improperly voting in a municipal by-election. She voted for friend and colleague Gail Nyberg who was running to replace Michael Prue who had been elected to the Provincial government in a September by-election. On advice from municipal officials, Minna cast a ballot even though she didn't live within the ward which occupies the northern half of her riding. According to municipal election rules, anyone who owns or rents a business is allowed to vote. Minna's constituency office was in the ward so that allowed her to cast a ballot. Soon after, Minna was dropped from Cabinet during a ministerial shuffle.

Minna was bitter about the demotion and complained to the Liberal Party's women's caucus that she was told to keep quiet about the issue. She claimed she was "hung out to dry by ambitious individuals...." Later she conceded that the PMO's office had told her that it would be better to wait for the results of the ethics investigation. Initially the ethics counsellor terminated the allegations probe since she was dropped from Cabinet but Minna insisted that it be reopened. She said, "It's my personal credibility that's at stake. It's not the cabinet post." Fellow Liberal MP Sheila Copps who sympathized with Minna's situation was quoted as saying, "The one thing you have in politics is your reputation." The probe was reopened and she was subsequently cleared of any wrongdoing.

During her time in government, Minna has held several leadership roles that have focused on immigration and international relations. In 1994 she was appointed Vice-Chair of the Standing Committee on Human Resources Development and served as Parliamentary Secretary to the Minister of Citizenship and Immigration from 1996 to 1998. In October 2004, Minna was appointed special adviser to the Minister of Foreign Affairs on issues of women, peace and security. In March 2005, Minna led a five-person Parliamentary delegation to assist with the peace process in Sri Lanka.

In opposition
From 2006 to January 2009 Minna was the Official Opposition Critic for the Status of Women.  Minna was the Official Opposition Critic for Labour. On May 2, 2011 during the 41st federal election Minna lost her seat to NDP candidate Matthew Kellway.

Awards
Minna has received several awards recognizing her involvement with the immigrant community. These include the Indo-Canada Chamber of Commerce President's Award (2001), the Permio Italia nel Mondo award for individuals of Italian origin (2001), Results Canada's Outstanding Leadership Award (2002), and the Canada-Sri Lanka Business Council's President's Award (2006).

Electoral record

References

External links

1948 births
Women members of the House of Commons of Canada
Italian emigrants to Canada
Liberal Party of Canada MPs
Living people
Members of the 26th Canadian Ministry
Members of the House of Commons of Canada from Ontario
Members of the King's Privy Council for Canada
University of Toronto alumni
Women in Ontario politics
21st-century Canadian women politicians
20th-century Canadian women politicians
Women government ministers of Canada